You Winding Me Up is 7" vinyl single by Hesta Prynn. It was released on December 8, 2010. The A-side is a mash-up of Hesta Prynn's 2010 song "You Winding Me Up" from the Can We Go Wrong EP and Blondie's 1978 song "Heart of Glass" from their Parallel Lines album. The B-side is a remix of "You Winding Me Up" by Bear Hands.

Track listing

Personnel
 Hesta Prynn – vocals, keyboards
 All other instrumentation by Chuck Brody and Jon Siebels

References

2010 singles
2010 songs
Songs written by Debbie Harry
Songs written by Chris Stein